The following is a list of all films shown at the 2015 Sundance Film Festival.

Feature competition
The following films were shown in competition at the 2015 Sundance Film Festival.

U.S. Documentary
The following 16 films were selected for a world premiere in U.S. Documentary Competition program. Cartel Land by Matthew Heineman served as the opening film of the program.

U.S. Dramatic
The following 16 films were selected for a world premiere in U.S. Dramatic Competition program. The Bronze by Bryan Buckley served as the opening film of the program.

World Cinema Documentary
The following 12 films were selected for a world premiere in World Cinema Documentary Competition program. How to Change the World by Jerry Rothwell served as the opening film of the program.

World Cinema Dramatic
The following 12 films were selected for a world premiere in World Cinema Dramatic Competition program. The Summer of Sangailé by Alantė Kavaitė served as the opening film of the program.

Next
The following 10 films were selected for a world premiere in Next program to highlight the American cinema. Christmas, Again by Charles Poekel served as the opening film of the program.

Short Programs
The following 60 short films were selected from a record 8,061 submissions.

USA Narrative Short Films

International Narrative Short Films

Documentary Short Films

Animated Short Films

Non-competition features
The following films were shown out of competition at the 2015 Sundance Film Festival.

Premieres
The following 18 feature films were selected for a world premiere in non-Competition program. A Walk in the Woods by Ken Kwapis served as the opening film of the program.

Documentary premieres
The following 13 films were selected for Documentary Premieres program. What Happened, Miss Simone? by Liz Garbus served as the opening film of the program.

Spotlight
The following 9 films were selected for Spotlight program. 99 Homes by Ramin Bahrani served as the opening film of the program.

Park City at Midnight
The following 8 films were selected for Park City at Midnight program. Knock Knock by Eli Roth served as the opening film of the program.

New Frontier Films
The following 19 films were selected for New Frontier Films program. The Royal Road by Jenni Olson served as the opening film of the program.

Special Events
The following 3 films were selected for Special Events program. Misery Loves Comedy by Kevin Pollak served as the opening film of the program.

Sundance Kids
The following 3 films were selected for Sundance Kids program. Operation Arctic by Grethe Bøe-Waal served as the opening film of the program.

From the Collection
The following film was selected for From the Collection program.

References

External links
 Sundance Film Festival Screening List at the Internet Movie Database

Sundance 2015
2015 films
Sundance films
Sundance films